Tobi 26 - Coptic Calendar - Tobi 28

The twenty-seventh day of the Coptic month of Tobi, the fifth month of the Coptic year. On a common year, this day corresponds to January 22, of the Julian Calendar, and February 4, of the Gregorian Calendar. This day falls in the Coptic Season of Shemu, the season of the Harvest.

Commemorations

Heavenly Orders 

 The commemoration of the Honorable Archangel Suriel

Martyrs 

 The martyrdom of Saint Abe-Fam the Soldier 
 The martyrdom of Saint Serapion

Other commemorations 

 The relocation of the Relics of Saint Timothy the Apostle

References 

Days of the Coptic calendar